Mazen Tal (born 1952) is a retired Jordanian ambassador.

Career
In 1976 he entered the foreign Service of Jordan.
From 1978 to 1983 he was attaché in Paris.

From 1984 to 1988 he was second secretary next the Jordanian Representation next the United Nations Office at Geneva.

From 1991 to 1992 he was member of the Group of Technical Experts, Jordanian delegation at the Madrid Conference of 1991. From 1992 to 1994 he was counselor next the Headquarters of the United Nations. From 1995 to 1999 he was counselor and deputy head of the Jordanian Embassy in New Delhi.

From 2000 to 2004 he was chargé d'affaires in Tel Aviv.
From 2005 to  he was ambassador in Pretoria (South Africa) with concurrent diplomatic accreditation in Maputo (Mozambique).

From  to  he was head of the European Department in the Foreign Affairs ministry in Amman.
From  to  he was ambassador in Berlin.

References

1952 births
Living people
Ambassadors of Jordan to Israel
Ambassadors of Jordan to South Africa
Ambassadors of Jordan to Germany